Until 1933, Article 66 of the Constitution of the Irish Free State permitted appeals of decisions of the Supreme Court of the Irish Free State to be made to the Judicial Committee of the Privy Council (JCPC) in London.  This was a requirement of the Anglo-Irish Treaty of 1921, which underpinned the creation of the Irish Free State. The treaty specified that the Free State's constitutional status would be the same as Canada, another British Dominion, whose local courts allowed further appeal to the JCPC.

While Article I of the 1921 treaty  said the Free State's "constitutional status" would match all the existing Dominions (Canada, Union of South Africa, Australia, New Zealand), Article II said "the relationship of the Crown or the representative of the Crown" to the Free State would match Canada. Although Article II ought to have covered the JCPC, in negotiations on the 1922 Free State constitution, the Lloyd George government allowed the provisional Irish government to use the model of South Africa, a unitary state with fewer JCPC appeals than Canada, a federal state for which the JCPC often heard cases of dispute between federal and provincial governments. Kevin O'Higgins predicted there would "not be two or three appeals in a century, where appeals [would] only be granted in very special cases, raising matters other than purely Irish interests, raising international issues of the first importance".

The Cumann na nGaedheal  governments of 1922–32 sought to minimise appeals to the Privy Council as undermining the autonomy of the Free State and giving fuel to its republican opponents. An additional impetus was that JCPC members included former politicians who were now Lords of Appeal, among them prominent unionists Lord Carson, Viscount Sumner, and Viscount Cave. In the event Carson and Sumner recused themselves from Free State cases; however, Cave did not and ruled against Cumann na nGaedheal in several cases. Conversely, Southern Irish unionists regarded the JCPC as a safeguard against tyranny of the majority, a fear which Irish nationalists insisted was unfounded.

Article XII of the 1921 treaty provided for a three-person Irish Boundary Commission to finalise the border between the Free State and Northern Ireland. In 1924, when Craigavon's Stormont government refused to appoint Northern Ireland's commissioner, MacDonald's Westminster government referred to the JCPC the question of whether it could either force Stormont to nominate or make one in its stead. The JCPC corresponded with Cosgrave's Dublin government, which chose to view the matter as internal to the UK and refused to be a party to the deliberations.

At the Imperial Conferences of 1926 and 1930, Cosgrave's governments attempted to secure the abolition of JCPC appeal; although neither conference explicitly agreed to this, the 1930 conference led to the UK Parliament recognising Dominion parliaments as its equals via the Statute of Westminster 1931. In the runup to that UK statute, Cosgrave's government prepared two bills for the Free State Oireachtas (parliament): one to remove Article 66 from the constitution, and the other to make any Supreme Court decision final. The bills had not been introduced by the 1932 general election after which Fianna Fáil came to power after and began removing British and monarchist elements from the constitution. The Constitution (Amendment No. 22) Act 1933 abolished the right of appeal to the JCPC. The JCPC itself ruled in 1935 that the Free State Oireachtas had the power to do so under the Statute of Westminster.

List of referrals

References

Footnotes

Sources

Citations

Further reading

External links
 The Judicial Committee of the Privy Council Decisions BAILII
 Documents on Irish Foreign Policy (search for "Privy Council")

 
Irish Free State
Ireland–United Kingdom relations
Constitution of the Irish Free State
Ireland and the Commonwealth of Nations